Fisher Kondowe (born November 6, 1976 in Blantyre) is a Malawian football (soccer) player who currently plays for Big Bullets. His position is midfielder. In 2020, he retired from football

References

External links

1976 births
Living people
People from Blantyre
Malawian footballers
Malawi international footballers
Bush Bucks F.C. players
Association football midfielders
Malawian expatriate sportspeople in South Africa
Bloemfontein Celtic F.C. players
Nyasa Big Bullets FC players
Expatriate soccer players in South Africa
Malawian expatriate footballers
Black Leopards F.C. players